Miriam Rose O'Neill Pritchard (born 21 December 1998) is an English international field hockey player who plays as a goalkeeper for Hampstead & Westminster and the England and Great Britain national teams.

Club career
Pritchard plays club hockey in Women's England Hockey League for Hampstead & Westminster.

She has also played hockey for Loughborough Students.

References

External links

1998 births
Living people
English female field hockey players
Women's England Hockey League players
Loughborough Students field hockey players
Female field hockey goalkeepers
Place of birth missing (living people)